Gabrielle Harbowy (born 1972) is an American author, editor, and anthologist. She has been Managing Editor at Dragon Moon Press, a copyeditor for Pyr, an imprint of Prometheus Books, and a Submissions Editor at Apex Magazine.

Works

Novels
Hellmaw: Of the Essence, TEGG (2016) - Runner Up, Science Fiction category, San Francisco Book Festival 
Gears of Faith, Paizo (2017)
Hearts Are Jerks, Heart Bow Books (2020)

Anthologies Edited
When the Hero Comes Home (co-edited with Ed Greenwood), Dragon Moon Press (2011) - ForeWord Book of the Year Finalist
When the Villain Comes Home (co-edited with Ed Greenwood), Dragon Moon Press (2012) 
When the Hero Comes Home 2 (co-edited with Ed Greenwood), Dragon Moon Press (2013)
Jacked In, Circlet Press (2014)
The Complete Guide to Writing for Young Adults, Dragon Moon Press (2015)
Women in Practical Armor (co-edited with Ed Greenwood), Evil Girlfriend Media (2016)

Published Short Fiction
Swimming Lessons in P.G. Holyfield's 'Tales of the Children' podcast, (2009)
Descent of the Wayward Sister in Cthulhurotica, Dagan Books (2010)
Keeping Time in When the Hero Comes Home, Dragon Moon Press (2011)
Deserter (with Marie Bilodeau) in Beast Within 2: Predator and Prey, Graveside Tales (2011)
Starkeep in When the Villain Comes Home, Dragon Moon Press (2012)
Arpeggio in Metastasis: An Anthology to Support Cancer Research, Wolfsinger Pub (2013)
Blood Magic in Witches, Stitches and Bitches, Evil Girlfriend Media (2013)
Inheritance in Pathfinder Tales web fiction, Paizo (2013)
Ghostlights in When the Hero Comes Home 2 (ebook edition), Dragon Moon Press (2013)
Catalyst in Stars of Darkover, Marion Zimmer Bradley Literary Works Trust (2014)
Skin Deep (with Leah Petersen) in Carbide Tipped Pens, Tor (2014)
X is for... in B is for Broken, Poise and Pen (2015)
Verthandi in The Bard's Tale, Silence in the Library (2015)
H is for... in C is for Chimera, Poise and Pen (2016)
The Voice of the Trees (with Ed Greenwood) in Women in Practical Armor, Evil Girlfriend Media (2016)
Small World in Onder Magazine - Issue 005, Onder Librum (2017)
A Study of Sixes in Crossroads of Darkover, Marion Zimmer Bradley Literary Works Trust (2018)
Cold Comfort in Fire: Demons, Dragons and Djinns, Tyche Books (2018)

Published RPG Adventures
Grotto of the Deluged God (PFS #9-22), Pathfinder RPG (Paizo) (2018)
Forge of Fangs (DDAL #8-15), Dungeons and Dragons: D&D Adventurers League (2019)

Published Non-Fiction
Next Year in Jerusalem in Invisible 2: Personal Essays on Representation in SF/F, edited by Jim C. Hines (2015)
Mom's Sneaky Tree in Chicken Soup for the Soul: It's Beginning to Look a Lot Like Christmas (2019)

Media Mentions

Podcasts
 Speculate! Podcast - Episode 61
 SF Signal Podcast - Episode 83
 Dead Robots' Society - Episode 185
 Dead Robots' Society - Episode 138
 Blog Talk Radio - Interview

Web
 Interview: The Gloaming Magazine
 Roundtable Interview: Clarkesworld Magazine
 Article: Counting Words in Onder Magazine - Issue 4
 Article: The Process of Process in Onder Magazine - Issue 1
 Creator Profile: Gabrielle Harbowy in Onder Magazine - Issue 1
 Interview: Tynga's Reviews
 Interview: Paizo Blog

Professional Affiliations
 Active Member, Science Fiction and Fantasy Writers of America
 Active Member, International Association of Media Tie In Writers

Awards and Distinctions
 Parsec Award Finalist, Short Fiction category (2010) 
 Jurist, Andre Norton Award (2015)
 Runner-up, Science Fiction category, San Francisco Book Festival (2016) For Hellmaw: Of the Essence

References

1972 births
Living people
Science fiction editors
American speculative fiction editors
American editors
American women editors
Women anthologists
21st-century American women